Eric Miller (born in Chicago, Illinois) is an American house music DJ, record producer and remixer. As E-Smoove, he worked for a number of years with Steve "Silk" Hurley and Maurice Joshua, before he hit the U.S. Hot Dance Music/Club Play chart in 1998 with "Deja Vu", which climbed to #16. The song reached #63 in the UK Singles Chart. His next U.S. dance chart entry came in 2002, when "Insatiable" hit #1. "Insatiable" was released under the pseudonym Thick Dick. It peaked at #35 in the UK. Both tracks featured lead vocals by his wife Latanza Waters.

Also in 2002, he appeared under another pseudonym, Praise Cats. The track "Shined on Me" first peaked at #56 in the UK in 2002, but on the remix featuring Andrea Love, it reached #24 there in May 2005.

See also
List of number-one dance hits (United States)
List of artists who reached number one on the US Dance chart

References

External links
Discogs discography for Eric Miller.

Year of birth missing (living people)
Living people
Musicians from Chicago
American DJs
American dance musicians
American electronic musicians
American house musicians
Electronic dance music DJs
Remixers
Club DJs